
Gmina Przesmyki is a rural gmina (administrative district) in Siedlce County, Masovian Voivodeship, in east-central Poland.

Villages
Gmina Przesmyki contains the villages and settlements of Cierpigórz, Dąbrowa, Głuchówek, Górki, Kaliski, Kamianki Lackie, Kamianki-Czabaje, Kamianki-Nicki, Kamianki-Wańki, Kolonia Łysowa, Kukawki, Lipiny, Łysów, Pniewiski, Podraczynie, Przesmyki, Raczyny, Stare Rzewuski, Tarków, Tarkówek, Wólka Łysowska, Zaborów, Zalesie and Zawady.

Neighbouring gminas
Gmina Przesmyki is bordered by the gminas of Korczew, Łosice, Mordy, Paprotnia and Platerów.

References

Polish official population figures 2006

Przesmyki
Siedlce County